St. Michael's Catholic Church is a historic Roman Catholic church near Cedar Hill, Tennessee, United States.  St. Michael's is the oldest Catholic church in continuous operation in Tennessee. Its building incorporates a log cabin structure built in 1842 that is the oldest Catholic church building in the state. It is listed on the National Register of Historic Places.

History

The founding congregants of the church were four families who settled near Turnersville between 1838 and 1840. They bought an acre (0.40 ha) of land from the nearby Wessyngton plantation to build a church. When the church was built, its location was a stagecoach stop on the route between Nashville and Clarksville.

From 1846 to 1855, the church operated a boarding school, Saint Michael's Male and Female Academy, located near the church. In 1864–5, the priest who served the church was Father Abram Ryan, who has been called "the poet-priest of the Confederacy".

In 1934–5, the log structure was sheathed with clapboard siding obtained from the dismantlement of an Episcopal church at Glen Raven and the building received a major addition, giving it a T-shaped plan. A bell tower was added to the front of the building in 1942, the church's centennial year. The bell that hangs in the tower came from the same church that provided the siding.

St. Michael's was the only Roman Catholic parish in Robertson County until 1944, when Our Lady of Lourdes church was formed in Springfield. St. Michael's now operates as a mission church of Our Lady of Lourdes. The church building was listed on the National Register of Historic Places on August 10, 1973.

References

External links
 Our Lady of Lourdes and St. Michael official website

Buildings and structures in Robertson County, Tennessee
Roman Catholic churches completed in 1842
Churches on the National Register of Historic Places in Tennessee
Roman Catholic churches in Tennessee
Roman Catholic Diocese of Nashville
National Register of Historic Places in Robertson County, Tennessee
19th-century Roman Catholic church buildings in the United States